Plagiostachys albiflora is a monocotyledonous plant species. It is part of the genus Plagiostachys and the family Zingiberaceae.

References

albiflora